Peyre (French) or Pèira in Occitan is a village in the Aveyron département, in southern France. Formerly an independent commune, it is part of the commune of Comprégnac since 1830. It belongs to "The most beautiful villages of France" association.

References 

Villages in Occitania (administrative region)
Plus Beaux Villages de France